Inga allenii is a species of plant in the family Fabaceae. It is found in Colombia, Costa Rica, and Panama. It is threatened by habitat loss.

References

allenii
Flora of Colombia
Flora of Costa Rica
Flora of Panama
Vulnerable plants
Taxonomy articles created by Polbot